An engineer's spirit level (or machinist's level) is generally used to level machines, although they may also be used to level large workpieces on machines such as planers. Using gravity as a reference and checking a machine's axis of travel at several points, the level is used to ensure the machine's axis is straight. A perfectly level machine does not actually need to be achieved, unless the particular manufacturing process requires it. Spirit levels are also used in building construction by carpenters and masons.

The upper image is a plain precision level used in the engineering field to level machines or workpieces; the lower image shows an adjustable precision level that has an accuracy of 1:10000. The adjustable nature of this level can also be used to measure the inclination of an object. 

The accuracy of a spirit level can be checked by placing it on any flat surface, marking the bubble's position and rotating the level 180°. The position of the bubble should then be symmetrical to the first reading. Machinist's levels provide screw mechanisms to center the bubbles.

Some levels have V grooves machined along their bases, enabling the level to sit on a round bar while remaining parallel with the bar's axis. They also have smaller cross levels to enable the second axes to be roughly checked or corrected and to ensure the primary axes' bubbles are at the tops of the vials.

A precision level (1:24000) is used to check the installation of precision machine tools in two axes. A lathe is manufactured with its base in a level plane and if it is not installed level distortions in the frame cause machining errors. Small milling machines are often roughly leveled but large mills are installed level. A worn lathe may have a twist introduced to the machine's bed to ensure that it turns parallel to the spindle axis, by twisting the bed (that is worn) to the spindle axis. A lathe has several leveling screws. Usually, such a fix has limited utility for only part of the cutting tool (carriage) travel. A lathe usually requires two or more leveling trials as the machine castings "settle into" the adjustments.

Dimensional instruments
Metalworking measuring instruments